The Artega GT was a mid-engined, rear wheel drive 2-seat sports car produced by German automobile manufacturer Artega between 2009 and 2012. The GT was Artega's first model. A total of 153 units were produced.

Overview

In early 2011 GTspirit tested the Artega GT in Belgium and finished by saying that, Overall a superb handling sports car with not a single failure and that it had excellent performance not easily found elsewhere''. The Artega GT was priced at approximately €75,000. 

The GT was built at a new factory in Delbrück, Germany with production starting in October 2008 and sales commencing in spring 2009.  Production was claimed to be limited to roughly 500 units per year.

History
First shown as a mock up at the 2007 Geneva Auto Show; the Artega GT debuted a year later at the 2008 Geneva Auto Show. Klaus Dieter Frers announced at the 2008 Detroit Auto Show that Artega was investing in a possible solar-powered concept vehicle to compete with the Tesla Roadster (2008) and Fisker Karma. Henrik Fisker, who also designed the Aston Martin V8 Vantage, contributed to the design of the Artega GT.

Bankruptcy
After the Artega company filed for bankruptcy in July 2012, production has ceased and the company has been bought by German automotive supplier firm Paragon AG, which has offered all employees new jobs. Paragon AG will continue to supply owners with service, according to the Artega-website.

Discontinuation
On 30 September 2012 the production of the Artega GT was halted. There are currently no plans to resume production.

Technical specification

Frame: Aluminum spaceframe. Rear module tubular space frame of high-tensile stainless steel

Bodywork: Carbon fiber reinforced polyurethane compound material

Dimensions (L X B X H): 3950 x 1880 x 

Kg/PS: About 3.6 kg/PS

Engine: VR6 direct-injection engine in the rear mid

Displacement: 

Performance:   at 6,600 rpm

Torque:  at 2,400 rpm

Layout: Rear-wheel-drive

Transmission: Six-speed direct-shift with Artega inverting stage (pat. appl.)

Acceleration 0 - : 4.6 seconds

Speed: more than  

https://www.auto-motor-und-sport.de/test/artega-gt-im-supertest-wie-schlaegt-sich-der-deutsche-lotus/technische-daten/

See also
 Oullim Spirra
 DC Avanti
 Mastretta MXT

References

External links
Artega Homepage official corporate website

Artega vehicles
Sports cars
Henrik Fisker
Cars of Germany
Cars powered by VR engines
Rear mid-engine, rear-wheel-drive vehicles
Coupés
Artega Automobile
Cars introduced in 2009